The Château of Val-Duchesse is a mansion and estate situated in the municipality of Auderghem in the Brussels-Capital Region of Belgium. The château, which occupies the site of a former priory, is owned by the Belgian Royal Trust.

Val-Duchesse played an important role as a venue for negotiations in Belgian and European politics after World War II. In 1956, Paul Henri Spaak led the Intergovernmental Conference on the Common Market and Euratom at the château, which prepared the Treaties of Rome in 1957 and the foundation of the European Economic Community and Euratom in 1958. The first formal meeting of the Hallstein Commission, the first European Commission, under the presidency of Walter Hallstein, was held on 16 January 1958 at the château.

From 23-25 April 1990, it hosted the Western European Union International Conference which agreed the sequence of accession of the Eastern European Countries of the former Warsaw Pact to European structures.

More recently, it has twice hosted the Belgo-British Conference, in 2002 and 2006.

History 

The priory for women was founded in 1262 by Adelaide of Burgundy, Duchess of Brabant, widow of Henry III, Duke of Brabant. "Duchess Adelaide" gave her name to the place Val Duchesse or Hertoginnedal (both meaning Valley of the Duchess).  According to the legend Aleydis was inspired by Saint Thomas of Aquin who is said to have been a guest at Val Duchesse.  It was the first priory for women in the Low Countries that followed the rule of Saint Dominic and was generously donated by Aleydis and other noble ladies. According to her wish Aleydis' heart was interred at a mausoleum that today has disappeared. 

The priory further flourished and gained considerable wealth thanks to the generous gifts of numerous royal persons and noble families.  In 1650 a wall was erected to protect the diverse edifices of the priory.  The present-day château was built as a residence for the prioress in 1780.

See also
List of castles in Belgium

References

External links

Castles in Belgium
Castles in Brussels
Chateau of Val-Duchesse